The 12619/20 Matsyagandha Superfast Express is a daily Superfast Express train running between Lokmanya Tilak Terminus (Mumbai) and Mangaluru Central. The train was introduced on 1 May 1998 as Mangalore-Kurla Express. The Matsyagandha Express travels through some of the very difficult terrains of India. Matsyagandha Express ( Train number 02619 run as special) travelling from Lokmanya Tilak Terminus, Mumbai (LTT) to Mangaluru Central became first train to take Roha-Veer double line on Konkan railway route on 30 August 2021 at 7.30p.m.

Background
Matsyagandha literally means "Smell of Fish" - the appellation was given since the train runs along the fishing coast of Western India adjoining the Arabian Sea–Konkan Railway route. The name is based on a name of character from the epic Mahabharata. It is a story of Satyavati who smell like a fish (Matsyagandha). Matsyagandha is also a famous Marathi musical play written by Vasant Kanetkar.  The train has become important link and emotional chord for natives of Dakshina Kannada, Udupi and Uttara Kannada districts living in Mumbai and surrounding cities.

Locomotion
As the Route is electrified, an (Electric Loco Shed ||Arakkonam (AJJ)(https://en.m.wikipedia.org/wiki/Electric_Loco_Shed,_Arakkonam) ,https://indiarailinfo.com/train/blog/matsyagandha-express-12620/1072/1470/466 Based WAP 4 hauls the 12619/12620 train from End to End.

Routes and Halts

Arrival and departure
12619 Matsyagandha Express departs Lokmanya Tilak Terminus, Mumbai at 15.20 and reaches Mangaluru Central(MAQ) at 7.30 A.M. next day,While 
12620 Matsyagandha Express departs Mangaluru Central(MAQ)railway station at 14.35 and reaches Lokmanya Tilak Terminus, Mumbai at 6.35 next day. However during monsoon (rainy season) the train has different time table. The monsoon time table of Konkan railway Corporation Limited is generally from 15 June to 30 September of every year.

Accident
This service had a major accident on 16 June 2004, known as the Karanjadi train crash. It derailed and fell off a bridge after colliding with boulders on the tracks, killing 14 people near Karanjadi station.

See also
Mumbai CST–Mangaluru Junction Superfast Express

References

External links
Matsyaganda
Timetable
Matsyagandha Express Route Map

Transport in Mangalore
Transport in Mumbai
Named passenger trains of India
Express trains in India
Rail transport in Karnataka
Rail transport in Goa
Rail transport in Maharashtra
Railway services introduced in 1998
Konkan Railway